Elachista stichospora is a moth in the family Elachistidae. It was described by Edward Meyrick in 1932. It is found in India.

The wingspan is about 7.6 mm. The forewings are greyish brown, mottled by dark brown tipped scales. The basal part of the wing is slightly lighter.
The dark brown scales form two elongate spots and the fringe scales are brown, while the fringe line is blackish brown. The hindwings are dark brown.

References

Moths described in 1932
stichospora
Moths of Asia